The Juno Awards of 1998 were presented in Vancouver, British Columbia, Canada. The primary ceremonies at GM Place before an audience of 10 000 on 22 March 1998.

Actor Jason Priestley of the television series Beverly Hills, 90210 hosted these ceremonies which were televised by CBC. A backstage internet telecast was also introduced for this year. Performers included Jann Arden, Econoline Crush, Leahy, Sarah McLachlan, Ron Sexsmith, and Shania Twain.

Nominations were announced on 11 February 1998. The previously combined Blues/Gospel category became separate Best Blues Album and Best Gospel Album categories as of this year.

The Canadian Music Hall of Fame welcomed David Foster as its 1998 inductee.

Controversy

Vancouver rap group Rascalz refused their Best Rap Recording award, citing that urban music was hidden in the untelevised Saturday ceremony, rather than being featured during the broadcast of the Sunday evening ceremonies. The band alleged that racism was a factor in the award's scheduling, and for several weeks cultural critics and hip hop musicians debated the issue – some suggested, in fact, that the hip hop award's lack of visibility could be seen as not just a result of Canadian hip hop's poor commercial performance, but also a contributing factor.

The award was moved to the main ceremony for the 1999 awards, where it was again won by Rascalz for their single "Northern Touch".

Nominees and winners

Best Female Vocalist
Winner: Sarah McLachlan

Other Nominees:
Jann Arden
Terri Clark
Loreena McKennitt
Shania Twain

Best Male Vocalist
Winner: Paul Brandt

Other Nominees:
Bruce Cockburn
John McDermott
Bruno Pelletier
Roch Voisine

Best New Solo Artist
Winner: Holly McNarland

Other Nominees:
Lhasa
Dayna Manning
Amy Sky
Tariq

Group of the Year
Winner: Our Lady Peace

Other Nominees:
Big Sugar
Blue Rodeo
Great Big Sea
The Tea Party

Best New Group
Winner: Leahy

Other Nominees:
Age of Electric
Bran Van 3000
Matthew Good Band
Wide Mouth Mason

Songwriter of the Year
Winner: Sarah McLachlan with Pierre Marchand, "Building A Mystery" by Sarah McLachlan

Other Nominees:
Jann Arden, "Wishing That", "The Sound of", "Ode to a Friend" by Jann Arden
Dean McTaggart, "Dark Horse" (with David Tyson and Amanda Marshall) by Amanda Marshall by Mjila Mason, "Love's Funny That Way" (with David Tyson and Tina Arena) by Wynonna and Tina Arena, "Ma Huitieme Merville" (with David Tyson) by Liane Foly
Odds, "Someone Who's Cool", "Nothing Beautiful", "Suppertime" by Odds
David Tyson, "Dark Horse" (with Dean McTaggart and Amanda Marshall) "Beautiful Goodbye" (with Christopher Ward), "Trust Me This Is Love" (with Dean McTaggart) by Amanda Marshall

Best Country Female Vocalist
Winner: Shania Twain

Other Nominees:
Terri Clark
Beverley Mahood
Shirley Myers
Michelle Wright

Best Country Male Vocalist
Winner: Paul Brandt

Other Nominees:
Julian Austin
Charlie Major
Jason McCoy
Duane Steele

Best Country Group or Duo
Winner: Farmer's Daughter

Other Nominees:
Cindy Church with Ian Tyson
The Cruzeros
Prairie Oyster
Thomas Wade and Wayward

International Achievement Award
Winners:

International Album
Spice by Spice Girls

Best Instrumental Artist
Winner: Leahy

Other Nominees:
Jesse Cook
Oscar Lopez
Robert Michaels
Mythos

Best Producer
Winner: Pierre Marchand, "Building A Mystery" by Sarah McLachlan

Other Nominees:
Peter Cardinali and Ian Thomas, "The Way of Things" and "Stuck in Between" by The Boomers
Corey Hart, "Miles to Go (Before I Sleep)" and "Where Is The Love" by Celine Dion
Arnold Lanni, "Superman's Dead" and "Clumsy" by Our Lady Peace
Michael Phillip Wojewoda and Spirit of the West, "Armstrong and the Guys" and "Our Ambassador" by Spirit of the West

Best Recording Engineer
Winner: Michael Phillip Wojewoda, "Armstrong and the Guys" and "Our Ambassador" by Spirit of the West

Other Nominees:
Lenny DeRose, "Shine" and "Pearly White" by Junkhouse
Kevin Doyle, "The Lark in the Clear Air" and "Barbara Allan" by John McDermott
Chad Irschick, "Godspeed" and "Constance" by Ron Hynes
Randy Staub, "Volcano Girls" by Veruca Salt and "The Unforgiven II" by Metallica

Canadian Music Hall of Fame
Winner: David Foster

Walt Grealis Special Achievement Award
Winner: Sam Feldman

Nominated and winning albums

Best Album
Winner: Surfacing, Sarah McLachlan,

Other Nominees:
Creature, Moist
Clumsy, Our Lady Peace
Come on Over, Shania Twain
Kissing Rain, Roch Voisine

Best Children's Album
Winner: Livin' in a Shoe, Judy & David

Other Nominees:
Chickee's on the Run, Heather Bishop
Enchantee, Carmen Campagne
Planet Lenny, Lenny Graf
The Truck I Bought From Moe, Al Simmons

Best Classical Album (Solo or Chamber Ensemble)
Winner: Marc-André Hamelin Plays Franz Liszt, Marc-André Hamelin

Other Nominees:
Bach: The Six Partitas, Angela Hewitt
Grainger: Piano Music, Marc-André Hamelin
Haydn: Four Piano Trios, The Gryphon Trio
La Jongleuse - Salon Pieces and Encores, Janina Fialkowska

Best Classical Album (Large Ensemble)
Winner:  Mozart Horn Concertos, James Sommerville, CBC Vancouver Orchestra, Mario Bernardi

Other Nominees:
Carnaval Romain, Orchestre symphonique de Montreal, conductor Charles Dutoit
Bizet: Symphony in C, Orchestre symphonique de Montreal, conductor Charles Dutoit
Tabuh-Tabuhan, Music of Colin McPhee, Esprit Orchestra, Alex Pauk
Rachmaninov: Piano Concerto No. 4, Toronto Symphony Orchestra, conductor Jukka-Pekka Saraste, piano Alexei Lubimov, Toronto Mendelssohn Choir

Best Classical Album (Vocal or Choral Performance)
Winner:  Soirée française, tenor Michael Schade, baritone Russell Braun, Canadian Opera Company Orchestra, Richard Bradshaw

Other Nominees:
Carl Orff: Carmina Burana, F.A.C.E. Treble Choir, choeur de l'Orchestre symphonique de Montreal, Orchestre symphonique de Montreal, conductor Charles Dutoit
The Mystery of Christmas, The Elora Festival Singers, Noel Edison
Palestrina: Missa "Ut, re, mi, fa, sol, la", Studio de musique ancienne de Montréal. Christopher Jackson
Vivaldi: Motets for soprano, Karina Gauvin, Les Chambristes de Ville Marie

Best Album Design
Winner: John Rummen, Crystal Heald, Stephen Chung, Andrew MacNaughtan, Justin Zivojinovich, Songs of a Circling Spirit by Tom Cochrane

Other Nominees:
Carylann Loeppky, Crystal Heald, Karma by Delerium
John Rummen, Dennis Keeley, Surfacing by Sarah McLachlan
Alex Wittholz, Felix Wittholz, Catherine McRae, Kevin Westenberg, Clumsy by Our Lady Peace
Michael Wrycraft, Kurt Swinghammer, Stephen Chung, David Wilcox Greatest Hits Too by David Wilcox

Best Blues Album
Winner: National Steel, Colin James

Other Nominees:
A Big Love, Lester Quitzau
In the Evening, Vann "Piano Man" Walls
No Special Rider, Bill Bourne, Andreas Schuld, Hans Stamer
What Were You Thinking?, The Rockin Highliners

Best Gospel Album
Winner: Romantics & Mystics, Steve Bell

Other Nominees:
Caught Up, Sharon Riley and Faith Chorale
Feel Free, Carolyn Arends
Just Look, Youth Outreach Mass Choir
Speak Lord To Me, Hiram Joseph

Best Selling Album (Foreign or Domestic)
Winner: Spice, Spice Girls

Other Nominees:
Aquarium, Aqua
Backstreet Boys, Backstreet Boys
Backstreet's Back, Backstreet Boys
Clumsy, Our Lady Peace

Best Mainstream Jazz Album
Winner: In The Mean Time, The Hugh Fraser Quintet

Other Nominees:
As We Are Now, Renee Rosnes
Have Fingers, Will Travel, Oliver Jones
Here on Earth, Ingrid Jensen
Love Scenes, Diana Krall

Best Contemporary Jazz Album
Winner: Metalwood, Metalwood

Other Nominees:
As If, Ted Quinlan
Best of Two Worlds, Stefan Bauer
Inclined, Carol Welsman
Paired Down, Volume One, D.D. Jackson

Best Roots or Traditional Album - Group
Winner: Molinos, The Paperboys

Other Nominees:
Compadres, James Keelaghan & Oscar Lopez
Leahy, Leahy
Play, Great Big Sea
Raw Voice, Wyrd Sisters

Best Roots or Traditional Album - Solo
Winner: Other Songs, Ron Sexsmith

Other Nominees:
Another Morning, J. P. Cormier
Industrial Lullaby, Stephen Fearing
Suas E!, Mary Jane Lamond
Words and Pictures, Bob Snider

Best Alternative Album
Winner: Glee, Bran Van 3000

Other Nominees:
Get Outta Dodge, Huevos Rancheros
Love Story, Copyright
Maybe It's Me, Treble Charger
Stuff, Holly McNarland

Best Selling Francophone Album
Winner: Marie-Michèle Desrosiers chante les classiques de Noël, Marie-Michèle Desrosiers

Other Nominees:
La force de comprendre, Dubmatique
Miserere, Bruno Pelletier
Parle pas si fort, Térez Montcalm
Versions Reno, Ginette Reno

Blockbuster Rock Album of the Year
Winner: Clumsy, Our Lady Peace

Other Nominees:
Econoline Crush, The Devil You Know
Headstones, Smile and Wave
Moist, Creature
The Tea Party, Transmission

Nominated and winning releases

Single of the Year
Winner: "Building a Mystery", Sarah McLachlan

Other Nominees:
"Clumsy", Our Lady Peace
"Dark Horse", Amanda Marshall
"Drinking in L.A.", Bran Van 3000
"The Sound Of", Jann Arden

Best Classical Composition
Winner: "Electra Rising", Malcolm Forsyth

Other Nominees:
"Adieu, Robert Schumann", R. Murray Schafer, The Garden of the Heart
"Gitanjali", R. Murray Schafer, The Garden of the Heart
"Symphony No. 2", Colin McPhee, Tabuh-Tabuhan, Music of Colin McPhee
"Winter Music", Alexina Louie, Tree Line; Music from Canada and Japan

Best Rap Recording
Winner: Cash Crop, Rascalz (refused)

Other Nominees:
"Gotta Get Mine", Infinite featuring Divine Earth Essence
"Just A Second Remix", Choclair
"Krazy World", Ghetto Concept
"Rain Is Gone", Frankenstein

Best R&B/Soul Recording
Winner: "Things Just Ain't The Same", Deborah Cox

Other Nominees:
"Don't Leave Me Hangin", Camille Douglas
"The Thing to Do", Glenn Lewis
Famous, Rich and Beautiful, Philosopher Kings
"How May I Do You", Unique

Best Music of Aboriginal Canada Recording
Winner: The Spirit Within, Mishi Donovan

Other Nominees:
Little Island Cree - World Hand Drum Champions, Little Island Cree with Clayton Chief
Necessary, No Reservations
That Side of the Window, Tom Jackson
Walk Away, Fara Palmer

Best Reggae/Calypso Recording
Winner: "Catch De Vibe", Messenjah

Other Nominees:
"Cry for the Children", Jahbeng
"Flex (Dancehall Mix)", Belinda Brady
Justuss, Snow
"Nice & Slow", Leroy Brown

Best Global Album
Winner: La Llorona, Lhasa

Other Nominees:
Arc, Thomas Handy Trio
Chamalongo, Jane Bunnett
Diye, Takadja
Varal, Celso Machado

Best Dance Recording
Winner: "Euphoria (Rabbit in the Moon Mix)", Delerium

Other Nominees:
"The Spell", Ivan
"Angel (Angelic Radio Mix)", Joee
"Move Ya Feet", Paul Jacobs
"Universal Dream (Telluric Club Mix)", Temperance

Best Video
Winner: Javier Aguilera, "Gasoline" by Moist

Other Nominees:
Tim Hamilton, "A Little in Love" by Paul Brandt
Lisa Mann, "Elmo" by Holly McNarland
Bill Morrison, "Everything Is Automatic" by Matthew Good Band
Tony Pantages, "Pearly White" by Junkhouse

References

External links
First live streaming of Juno Awards; a special behind the scenes cybercast
Juno Awards site

1998 music awards
1998
1998 in Canadian music